Ian Douglas Cole (born February 21, 1989) is an American professional ice hockey defenseman currently playing for the Tampa Bay Lightning of the National Hockey League (NHL). Cole won the Stanley Cup with the Pittsburgh Penguins in 2016 and 2017.

Playing career

College
Cole joined the University of Notre Dame Fighting Irish in 2007 after playing for the U.S. National Team Development Program from 2005 to 2007. Cole played at Notre Dame from the 2007–08 season through the 2009–10 season, Cole finished his collegiate career with 69 points in 111 games at Notre Dame. During Cole's stint at Notre Dame the program qualified for the NCAA Tournament in 2007, 2008, and 2009, including the school's first Frozen Four appearance in 2008.

Professional

St. Louis Blues
Cole was drafted 18th overall by the St. Louis Blues in the 2007 NHL Entry Draft. At the conclusion of the 2009–10 season, Cole turned pro and signed with the St. Louis Blues and was assigned to the Peoria Rivermen of the American Hockey League, the Blues' top minor league affiliate. Cole made his NHL debut on November 6, 2010 after being recalled from Peoria on November 4. He scored his first NHL goal on March 9, 2011 against Columbus Blue Jackets goaltender, Mathieu Garon.

Pittsburgh Penguins
On March 2, 2015, the Pittsburgh Penguins acquired Ian Cole from the Blues in exchange for Robert Bortuzzo and a 2016 7th-round draft pick.

On June 29, 2015, Cole signed a three-year contract worth $6.3 million to remain in Pittsburgh. In the 2015–16 season, Cole registered 12 assists in 70 games. In the post-season on June 6, 2016, Cole scored his first career playoff goal against Martin Jones of the San Jose Sharks in Game 4 of the Stanley Cup Finals.

In the 2016–17 season, Cole reached a career high of 26 points with the Penguins, including five goals and 21 assists in 81 regular season games. He appeared in a post-season high 25 games, registering 9 assists in helping Pittsburgh defend the Stanley Cup.

Entering the final season of his contract with the Penguins in 2017–18, on October 7, 2017, Cole blocked a shot from Nashville Predators defenceman Roman Josi and missed the next three games to recover. Cole appeared in 47 games with the Penguins, posting 13 points, before on February 23, 2018, Cole was traded to the Ottawa Senators along with a 2018 first-round pick, a 2019 third-round draft pick, and Filip Gustavsson in exchange for a 2018 third-round draft pick, prospect Vincent Dunn, and Derick Brassard.

Columbus Blue Jackets
On February 26, 2018, before appearing with the Senators, Cole was traded to the Columbus Blue Jackets in exchange for Nick Moutrey and a 2020 third-round pick. Cole's addition to Columbus' blueline, led to a charge up the standings and secured a playoff berth. In 20 regular season games, he contributed with 2 goals and 7 points before registering 3 assists in 6 post-season games in a first-round defeat to eventual champions, the Washington Capitals.

Colorado Avalanche
As a free agent in the off-season, Cole signed a three-year, $12.75 million contract with the Colorado Avalanche on July 1, 2018.

On February 8, during a 2018–19 regular season game against the Washington Capitals, Cole laid a late hit on Evgeny Kuznetsov resulting in a fight with Tom Wilson. It was determined that Tom Wilson had fractured Cole's orbital bone and he was subsequently placed on Colorado's injured reserve.

Entering his final year under contract with the Avalanche in the pandemic delayed 2020–21 season, Cole played in a third pairing role in the opening two games.

Minnesota Wild
On January 19, 2021, Cole was traded by the Avalanche to divisional rival club, the Minnesota Wild, in exchange for Greg Pateryn. Cole made an instant impact, solidifying the Wild's third pairing and helping the team push up the standings in recording 1 goal and 8 points through 52 regular season games. In a first-round series defeat to the Vegas Golden Knights, Cole featured in all seven games.

Carolina Hurricanes
As a free agent, despite showing interest to return to the Wild, Cole was unable to come to terms and was signed to a one-year, $2.9 million contract with the Carolina Hurricanes on July 28, 2021. He scored the overtime game-winning goal against the New York Rangers in Game 1 of their 2nd round series in the 2022 Stanley Cup playoffs.

Tampa Bay Lightning
Having concluded his contract with the Hurricanes, Cole was again on the move in agreeing to a one-year, $3 million contract with the Tampa Bay Lightning on July 13, 2022. 

The Lightning announced the team had suspended Cole, with pay, on October 10, 2022, pending an investigation into allegations of sexual abuse. "I take the allegations made against me today in an anonymous tweet very seriously," Cole said in a statement made through his agent. "I look forward to clearing my name and demonstrating to the NHL and the Tampa Bay Lightning that these allegations are unfounded."

International play

Cole's first international experience came at the 2007 World Junior Championships (WJC) in Sweden. Cole added four goals and an assist in all seven games at the 2007 WJC, helping Team USA to a bronze medal finish. The 2007 WJC marked the most points Cole would score at the event, in 2008 he was held pointless and in his final appearance in the tournament in 2009 he finished with two goals and two assists.

Personal life
Ian Douglas Cole was born and raised in Ann Arbor, Michigan with his younger sister, mother Connie, and father Doug. He learned to skate at Yost Ice Arena. He also skated outdoors at Buhr Park and did power skating at Veterans Memorial Ice Arena Ann Arbor. Growing up, he played for the Ann Arbor Amateur Hockey Association at the Ice Cube.

In June 2015, he married long time girlfriend Jordan Rockwell.

Career statistics

Regular season and playoffs

International

Awards and honors

References

External links
 

1989 births
Living people
AHCA Division I men's ice hockey All-Americans
American men's ice hockey defensemen
Carolina Hurricanes players
Colorado Avalanche players
Columbus Blue Jackets players
Minnesota Wild players
National Hockey League first-round draft picks
Notre Dame Fighting Irish men's ice hockey players
Peoria Rivermen (AHL) players
Pittsburgh Penguins players
St. Louis Blues draft picks
St. Louis Blues players
Stanley Cup champions
Tampa Bay Lightning players
USA Hockey National Team Development Program players